Adéla Hanzlíčková (born May 4, 1994) is a Czech freestyle wrestler. She competed in the women's freestyle 63 kg event at the 2016 Summer Olympics, in which she was eliminated in the round of 16 by Henna Johansson.

In 2020, she won the silver medal in the women's 68 kg event at the Individual Wrestling World Cup held in Belgrade, Serbia. In March 2021, she competed at the European Qualification Tournament in Budapest, Hungary hoping to qualify for the 2020 Summer Olympics in Tokyo, Japan. She did not qualify at this tournament and she also failed to qualify for the Olympics at the World Olympic Qualification Tournament held in Sofia, Bulgaria. In October 2021, she lost her bronze medal match in the 68 kg event at the World Wrestling Championships held in Oslo, Norway.

In 2022, she won one of the bronze medals in the 68 kg event at the Yasar Dogu Tournament held in Istanbul, Turkey. She lost her bronze medal match in the 68 kg event at the 2022 European Wrestling Championships held in Budapest, Hungary. She competed in the 68 kg event at the 2022 World Wrestling Championships held in Belgrade, Serbia.

She won the silver medal in the women's 68kg event at the 2023 Grand Prix Zagreb Open held in Zagreb, Croatia.

References

External links
 

1994 births
Living people
Czech female sport wrestlers
Olympic wrestlers of the Czech Republic
Wrestlers at the 2016 Summer Olympics
Wrestlers at the 2015 European Games
Wrestlers at the 2019 European Games
European Games competitors for the Czech Republic
European Wrestling Championships medalists
21st-century Czech women